Siegfried Wichmann (10 February 1921 – 6 May 2015) was a German art historian and authority on Japonisme.

Selected publications
 Eduard Schleich der Ältere 1812–1874. München, Phil. F., Diss. v. 11. Sept. 1953
 mit Hans Wichmann: Schach. Ursprung und Wandlung der Spielfigur in zwölf Jahrhunderten, Callwey, München 1960
 Aladin Lampe (Pseudonym): Die Dame und der König : Kulturgeschichte d. Schachspiels. Bruckmann, München 1962
 Manuel Albrecht (Pseudonym): Carl Spitzwegs Malerparadies. Schuler, Stuttgart 1968
 Franz von Lenbach und seine Zeit. DuMont, Köln 1973
 Japonismus: Ostasien – Europa. Begegnungen in der Kunst des 19. und 20. Jahrhunderts. Herrsching 1980
 Julius Seyler – Neuentdeckte Werke, 1988
 Münchner Landschaftsmaler im 19. Jahrhundert. Meister, Schüler, Themen. Seehamer, Weyarn 1996
 Compton. Edward Theodore und Edward Harrison; Maler und Alpinisten. Belser-Verlag, Stuttgart 1999
 Karl Mostböck – der Maler der kodifizierten Form, mit Vorwort von Walter Koschatzky, Einführung Siegfried Wichmann, Spital am Pyrn, 2001
 Carl Spitzweg – Reisen und Wandern in Europa und der Glückliche Winkel. Belser, Stuttgart 2002
 Carl Spitzweg – Verzeichnis der Werke. Gemälde und Aquarelle. Belser, Stuttgart 2002
 mit Christa Habrich: Carl Spitzweg, der Maler und Apotheker. Natur und Naturwissenschaft in seinem Werk. Zur Ausstellung im Deutschen Medizinhistorischen Museum Ingolstadt. Belser, Stuttgart 2003
 Die große Geste im kleinen Format, Der Maler Karl Mostböck, in: Parnass, Kunstmagazin, 2003
 Siegfried Wichmann u.a.: Karl Mostböck, Modulationen in Farbe und Zeichen, Steyr, 2006
 Die Tötung des Königs Ludwig II. von Bayern. Selbstverlag, 2007

References 

1921 births
2015 deaths
German art historians